Gnoma is a genus of longhorn beetles of the subfamily Lamiinae, containing the following species:

 Gnoma admirala Dillon & Dillon, 1951
 Gnoma affinis Boisduval, 1835
 Gnoma agroides Thomson, 1860
 Gnoma atomaria Guérin de Méneville, 1834
 Gnoma australis Schwarzer, 1926
 Gnoma blanchardi Breuning, 1945
 Gnoma boisduvali Plavilstshikov, 1931
 Gnoma confusa J. Thomson, 1865
 Gnoma geelvinka Dillon & Dillon, 1951
 Gnoma gilmouri Dillon & Dillon, 1951
 Gnoma jugalis Newman, 1842
 Gnoma longicollis (Fabricius, 1787)
 Gnoma luzonica Erichson, 1834
 Gnoma malasiaca Breuning, 1983
 Gnoma minor Gressitt, 1952
 Gnoma nicobarica Breuning, 1936
 Gnoma pseudosuturalis Schwarzer, 1926
 Gnoma pulvurea Pascoe, 1866
 Gnoma sticticollis Thomson, 1857
 Gnoma subfasciata Thomson, 1865
 Gnoma suturalis Westwood, 1832
 Gnoma suturifera Schwarzer, 1929
 Gnoma thomsoni Dillon & Dillon, 1951
 Gnoma uniformis Dillon & Dillon, 1951
 Gnoma vittaticollis Aurivillius, 1923
 Gnoma zonaria (Linnaeus, 1758)

References

Lamiini